WHP (580 kHz) is a commercial AM radio station licensed to Harrisburg, Pennsylvania, serving the Harrisburg–Carlisle region of South Central Pennsylvania.  It broadcasts a talk radio format and is owned by iHeartMedia, Inc.  The studios are on Corporate Circle in Harrisburg. Weekdays begin with a local talk show hosted by R.J. Harris followed by nationally syndicated conservative talk shows from Sean Hannity, Glenn Beck, Jesse Kelly, Clay Travis & Buck Sexton and "Coast to Coast AM with George Noory."

WHP is powered at 5,000 watts, non-directional during the day.  But to protect other stations on 580 AM from interference at night, it is uses a directional antenna with a six-tower array.  The transmitter is on Tower Road near Interstate 81 in East Pennsboro Township near Enola, Pennsylvania.  Programming is simulcast on FM translator 103.7 W279EC and on the HD2 digital subchannel of sister station 97.3 WRVV.

History

WHBG and WMBS
The Department of Commerce granted John S. Skane a license for a new station on 1300 kHz on February 20, 1925, with the sequentially assigned call letters WHBG. In late 1926, ownership was transferred to Macks Battery Service, and the call sign was changed to WMBS. The station later operated on 820 kHz, and the Federal Radio Commission (FRC) reallocated the station on June 1, 1927, to 1280 kHz.

On October 19, 1928, the FRC granted Mack's Battery Company a construction permit to move the station to 1430 kHz, followed by a new license for operation on the new frequency on January 31, 1929. WMBS was required to share the 1430 kHz frequency with WBAK and hence it could not be a full-time station.

WHP
The station's license was transferred by the FRC to Pennsylvania Broadcasting Company effective March 22, 1929, accompanied by a change in call sign to WHP. On December 1, 1930, the FRC granted another transfer of the license to WHP, Incorporated.  On January 26, 1933, WHP was granted full time operation, no longer having to share its frequency. The FRC granted WHP full-time operation (6 a.m. to 1 a.m.) on April 27, 1934.

WHP moved from 1430 kHz to 1460 kHz on March 29, 1941. On that day, 795 US radio stations changed frequency as the result of the North American Regional Broadcasting Agreement (NARBA), signed in Havana with representatives from Canada, US, Mexico, Cuba, Haiti, and the Dominican Republic.  

For most of its history, WHP was a network affiliate of CBS Radio.  It carried CBS's schedule of dramas, comedies, news, sports, soap operas, game shows and big band broadcasts during the "Golden Age of Radio."  In an advertisement in the 1952 Broadcasting Yearbook, WHP is described as "The Key Station of the Keystone State."  The ad says WHP is "welcomed into tens of thousands of homes in Pennsylvania's rich South-Central belt. It is the CBS station serving Harrisburg, Lancaster, York and Lebanon."

FM and TV stations
In 1946, an FM station was added, WHP-FM.  It originally broadcast on 43.5 MHz, moving to 97.3 MHz several months later.  In its early years, WHP-FM mostly simulcast the AM station, later switching to beautiful music in the 1960s and is today classic rock WRVV "97.3 The River."

In 1953, a television station was added, WHP-TV, originally on Channel 55 and now on Channel 21.  Because WHP had long been a CBS Radio affiliate, WHP-TV carried CBS television programs, along with some shows from the DuMont Television Network.

The Federal Communications Commission granted WHP a construction permit on January 6, 1950, to move the station from 1460 kHz to 580 kHz, followed by a new license for operation on the new frequency effective May 1, 1952.  The frequency lower on the AM dial gave WHP a larger coverage area and stronger signal.  

As network programming moved from radio to television in the 1950s and 1960s, WHP switched to a full service, middle of the road (MOR) format of popular adult music, news, talk and sports.  In the 1980s, as music listening moved from AM to FM radio, WHP added more talk programming and by the 1990s, it had transitioned to a talk radio station.

iHeart ownership
In August 1998, the Dame Media stations, including WHP and WRVV, were sold to Clear Channel Communications, the forerunner to iHeartMedia.  In 2007, Clear Channel sold WHP-TV and its other television properties to concentrate on radio.  WHP-TV is currently owned by the Sinclair Broadcasting Group, even though it continues to share its call letters with WHP Radio.

WHP once broadcast using HD Radio technology.  But its digital signal was reported off the air as of July 2017.

Programming

Weekday mornings begin with a news and interview program hosted by R.J. Harris.  The show is simulcast on co-owned 1340 WRAW in Reading.  The rest of the weekday schedule is from iHeart subsidiary Premiere Networks:  The Glenn Beck Radio Program, The Clay Travis and Buck Sexton Show, The Sean Hannity Show, The Jesse Kelly Show and Coast to Coast AM with George Noory.  Weekends feature shows on money, health, guns, gardening, travel and technology, some of which are paid brokered programming.  Syndicated weekend hosts include Leo Laporte: The Tech Guy, Sunday Night Live with Bill Cunningham and Somewhere in Time with Art Bell.  Most hours begin with an update from Fox News Radio.

Until July 2022, WHP had a local afternoon drive time host, Ken Matthews.  Matthews was named one of the 100 most important talk radio show hosts (the "Heavy Hundred") in America by TALKERS Magazine in 2020.  Another past host on WHP was Bob Durgin, on the station from 1989 to 2013.

Translator
WHP (AM) programming is simulcast on the following FM translator:

References

External links
 

HP
News and talk radio stations in the United States
Radio stations established in 1925
IHeartMedia radio stations
1925 establishments in Pennsylvania